The Scene Is Not for Sale is the second and last album by the L.A. punk rock band Glue Gun. It was released in November 1995.

Track listing
 "Drug Life" 
 "The Scene Is Not for Sale" 
 "Happy Forever"
 "Self Respect"
 "Powder Keg" 
 "Land of Treason"
 "No Not Never" 
 "Problem Child"
 "Confess"
 "Inside of Me"
 "Skate the Haight"
 "Rock & Roll Star"

Notes
 "Land of Treason" is a cover of the Germs and "Problem Child" is a cover of Wasted Youth.

Glue Gun (band) albums
1995 albums